Andrew Bachman (born June 9, 1983) is an American entrepreneur and investor. He is the founder of several companies, including Game Plan Holdings; after being charged with mobile cramming by the Federal Trade Commission, he resigned as president, chief executive officer, chief financial officer and chairman of Game Plan Holdings on February 11, 2014. He later agreed to a settlement with the FTC that includes a monetary judgment of more than $97 million. The judgment was partially suspended based on Bachman’s inability to pay the full amount, after he turned over nearly all of his assets.

Early life and education
Bachman was born and raised in Wayland, Massachusetts, to physician parents. He attended Babson College in Wellesley, Massachusetts, graduating in 2006. From 2010 through 2013, Bachman co-funded a scholarship at his alma mater however his sponsorship of the scholarship has been rescinded by the college following the FTC proceedings and seizure of his assets

Career

Tatto Media
In 2005, while at Babson, Bachman partnered with fellow Babson students Lin Miao, Lucas Brown and Lee Brown to create Tatto Media, an Internet advertising and marketing company. The company offered advertisers a different way to pay for online banner advertising, with payment based on performance rather than impressions. Bachman served as president of Tatto, which was based in Boston and also had offices in Seattle and Los Angeles.

In 2008, Tatto was named a Top Global 250 company by AlwaysOn. That year, the company reached annual revenue figures of $40 million. The following year, revenues topped $100 million, and by 2010, according to comScore, the company had become the third-largest ad network in the world, and had 120 employees.

Tatto was sued by the attorney general of Washington state in 2008 and again in 2009 for running MyLuvCrush ads that promised to reveal the identity of a user's secret admirer. Instead, users were sent a text with the name of a fake person and then charged a subscription fee for monthly horoscopes. In November 2009, Facebook banned Tatto from providing offers in games and apps. This was due to "repeated policy violations" of the social network's guidelines for offers, specifically for deceptive in-game ads and other scamming issues enabling the company to collect hidden obligations and fees. Former Zynga CEO Mark Pincus referred to Tatto as the "worst offender" on Facebook.

In 2011, mobile social network game developer Ozura World acquired Tatto Media for $60 million. By 2013, according to Liao, Tatto was defunct and no longer had any ties to Ozura World.

Scambook
On March 1, 2011, following the sale of Tatto, Bachman, Miao and Jay Edelson, managing partner of law firm Edelson PC, founded Scambook.com, a consumer-complaint platform that linked consumers with attorneys to address various types of scams perpetrated by companies. Bachman served as the company's president. In 2011, after being named to the Empact 100 list of top US entrepreneurs under the age of 30, Bachman was invited to the White House and honored for his accomplishments at Scambook. He sold his shares of Scambook in July 2012.

In 2013, Scambook was investigated by the Illinois attorney general's office for fraudulent trading. The FBI received thousands of complaints from both companies and consumers about Scambook's unethical activities and lack of transparency. Investigations alleged that Scambook would post fraudulent complaints about companies and individuals. Companies were then expected to subscribe to Scambook's business resolve service, where they effectively had to pay a monthly fee in order to remove the complaints made against them. The Chicago Better Business Bureau gave Scambook an F rating and issued a red alert against the company due to a pattern of unresolved complaints, and the fact that, in Chicago, there was no office at the address listed for the company.

Game Plan Holdings
In April 2012, Bachman became president and chief financial officer of Game Plan Holdings, a supplement company he co-founded with two of his former Babson College students. He became chairman and chief executive officer in March 2013. Game Plan Holdings is a publicly traded company under the ticker GPLH. Game Plan formerly operated the sports-related social networking sites Hazzsports.com, Totalscout.com and CheckinSave.com, all of which were folded in February 2013. At that time, Game Plan Holdings acquired Sporting Blood, a vitamin and nutritional supplements company, and launched Game Plan Nutrition, which makes protein shakes and other supplements. It has an online network of trainers who earn commissions by recommending the company's products. The nutritional products have been used by NFL, NBA and MLB athletes.

In November 2013, Bachman was featured in the Boston Globe as an example of "fit entrepreneurs" breaking longstanding stereotypes of the tech world. On February 11, 2014, he resigned as president, chief executive officer, chief financial officer and chairman of Game Plan.

Legal issues
In December 2013, charges were filed by the Federal Trade Commission in US District Court against Bachman, Miao and corporate defendants including Tatto, accusing them of a mobile cramming scheme. Miao's attorneys denied that Tatto engaged in deceptive or unfair practices, and argued the suit had no merit because Tatto was no longer in business. On June 15, 2014, the FTC announced that Miao and the corporate defendants agreed to surrender more than $10 million in assets to settle the monetary judgment of over $150 million. Although he was named in the original FTC complaint, Bachman was not named in the settlement. He was, however, said to be involved with some of the corporate defendants in the settlement at the time of the alleged scheme. Bachman stated that he was years removed from any involvement with Tatto.

In Augusts 2014, judgment was entered against Bachman in the amount of approximately $97 million. The judgment was partially suspended based on Bachman's inability to pay the full amount. He agreed to surrender over $1.2 million in assets to settle the FTC charges. He also was permanently banned from placing any charges on consumers' phone bills, misrepresenting products or a consumer's obligation to pay, and was prohibited from charging consumers for a product or service without their consent, which were similar to the conditions Miao and the corporate defendants faced in their settlement.

Among the assets Bachman was required to surrender under the terms of the settlement are:
the contents of four bank accounts, less $4,500;
two vehicles: a 2012 Ferrari 458 Italia and a 2012 Mercedes G550 SUV;
shares in a number of startup companies; and
jewelry items, including three Audemars watches, one Patek Phillippe watch, and four Rolex watches.

References

External links
Game Plan website

Living people
American investors
American stock traders
Businesspeople from Massachusetts
Babson College alumni
People from Wayland, Massachusetts
1983 births
American chief financial officers
American chief executives